Everything and More is the fourth studio album by the American country music singer Billy Gilman, released in 2005 as his first album for Image Entertainment. "Hey, Little Suzie" and the title track were both released as singles, although neither reached the charts.

Track listing

Personnel
 Bruce Bouton – pedal steel guitar
 Joe Chemay – bass guitar
 Thom Flora – background vocals
 Billy Gilman – lead vocals
 Tommy Harden – drums
 Jeff King – electric guitar
 Paul Leim – drums
 Chris Leuzinger – electric guitar
 Jimmy Nichols – organ, piano, synthesizer, string arrangements
 John Wesley Ryles – background vocals
 Hank Singer – mandolin
 Marty Slayton – background vocals
 Michael Spriggs – acoustic guitar
 Russell Terrell – background vocals
 Cindy Walker – background vocals
 Fletcher Watson – acoustic guitar
 Curtis Wright – background vocals
 Curtis Young – background vocals

Chart performance

References

2005 albums
Billy Gilman albums
Image Entertainment albums